The Bruce Building may refer to:

Bruce Building (Manhattan), also known as 254-260 Canal Street
Bruce Building (Newcastle University)